Hornepayne First Nation is a non-status Ojibwe First Nation band government whose reserve is located north of Hornepayne, Ontario, Canada. They are members of the Matawa First Nations, a non-profit Regional Chiefs' Council, and the Nishnawbe Aski Nation, a tribal political organization representing majority of Ojibwe and Cree First Nations in northern Ontario.

External links
Community profiles (including Hornepayne's) by the Ontario Native Education Counselling Association
firstnation.ca profile
Hornepayne First Nation 

Ojibwe governments